Rhea May Ibrahim Taleb (born 20 March 2001) is a Lebanese footballer who plays as a midfielder for Lebanese club Safa.

Club career
Taleb joined Safa in 2019; she scored one goal and made one assist in 11 games in the 2019–20 season.

Honours 
Safa
 WAFF Women's Clubs Championship: 2022
 Lebanese Women's Football League: 2020–21

Lebanon
 WAFF Women's Championship third place: 2019

See also
 List of Lebanon women's international footballers

References

External links

 
 
 

2001 births
Living people
People from Matn District
Lebanese women's footballers
Lebanon women's international footballers
Women's association football midfielders
Lebanese Women's Football League players
Lebanon women's youth international footballers
ÓBerytus players
Safa WFC players